Colwyn is a borough in Delaware County, Pennsylvania. The population was 2,546 at the 2010 census.

Geography
Colwyn is located along the eastern border of Delaware County at  (39.913062, -75.253409), where Darby Creek and Cobbs Creek intersect. It is bordered to the north by the borough of Darby, to the west by Sharon Hill, to the south by Darby Township, and to the east across by Philadelphia.

Transportation

No numbered highways serve Colwyn directly. Fourth Street is the longest street within borough limits.

The Darby station on the SEPTA Wilmington/Newark Line is on Pine Street in Darby, just west of the Colwyn border.

Demographics

As of 2010 census, the racial makeup of the borough was 15.9% White, 80.1% African American, 0.7% Asian, 0.6% from other races, and 2.6% from two or more races. Hispanic or Latino of any race were 1.6% of the population. 25.7% of the borough's population was foreign-born, mostly African-born.

Budgetary disarray
The borough government is in financial difficulty. In May 2015, it was declared to be "financially distressed" by the state. With an annual budget of about two million dollars, the borough is more than one million dollars in debt.

The local district attorney has seized financial records, although at least some from 2011, 2012, and 2013 cannot be accounted for.

The local tax rate is very high; press reports indicate it to be five times higher than in richer regional towns. No new buildings have been built in Colwyn since 2007.

Education
William Penn School District serves Colwyn.
 Colwyn Elementary School (K-6)
 Penn Wood Middle School (7-8) (Darby)
 Penn Wood High School, Cypress Street Campus (9-10) (Yeadon)
 Penn Wood High School, Green Ave Campus (11-12) (Lansdowne)

Notable people
Alice Neel, visual artist

References

External links

 Borough of Colwyn official website

1698 establishments in Pennsylvania
Boroughs in Delaware County, Pennsylvania
Populated places established in 1698